This is a complete list of the 12 summits with elevation higher than  in the U.S. state of California, with at least   of topographic prominence. In mountaineering parlance, these peaks are known as fourteeners. The main fourteener article has a list of all of the fourteeners in the United States, as well as references, more information about how the list is determined, and caveats about accuracy.

The summit of a mountain or hill may be measured in three principal ways:
The topographic elevation of a summit measures the height of the summit above a geodetic sea level.
The topographic prominence of a summit is a measure of how high the summit rises above its surroundings.
The topographic isolation (or radius of dominance) of a summit measures how far the summit lies from its nearest point of equal elevation.



Summits higher than 14,000 feet

The following sortable table comprises the 12 California summits with at least  of elevation and at least  of topographic prominence.

See also

List of mountain peaks of North America
List of mountain peaks of Greenland
List of mountain peaks of Canada
List of mountain peaks of the Rocky Mountains
List of mountain peaks of the United States
List of mountain peaks of Alaska
List of mountain peaks of California
List of the major 4000-meter summits of California
List of the major 3000-meter summits of California

List of mountain ranges of California
List of mountain peaks of Colorado
List of mountain peaks of Hawaii
List of mountain peaks of Montana
List of mountain peaks of Nevada
List of mountain peaks of Utah
List of mountain peaks of Washington (state)
List of mountain peaks of Wyoming
List of mountain peaks of México
List of mountain peaks of Central America
List of mountain peaks of the Caribbean
California
Geography of California
:Category:Mountains of California
commons:Category:Mountains of California
Physical geography
Topography
Topographic elevation
Topographic prominence
Topographic isolation

Notes

References

External links

United States Geological Survey (USGS)
Geographic Names Information System @ USGS
United States National Geodetic Survey (NGS)
Geodetic Glossary @ NGS
NGVD 29 to NAVD 88 online elevation converter @ NGS
Survey Marks and Datasheets @ NGS
Bivouac.com
Peakbagger.com
Peaklist.org
Peakware.com
Summitpost.org
MapDEX - California 14ers
VRMC California Thirteeners
VRMC California Fourteeners

Fourteeners of California
 

Lists of landforms of California
California Fourteeners, List of
California Fourteeners, List of